Ibuproxam is a nonsteroidal anti-inflammatory drug (NSAID).

References

Hydroxamic acids
Anti-inflammatory agents
Benzene derivatives